Gravel Hill is an unincorporated community in Buckingham County, in the U.S. state of Virginia.

The Buckingham Female Collegiate Institute Historic District was listed on the National Register of Historic Places in 1984.

References

Unincorporated communities in Buckingham County, Virginia